Williams' Book Store was a historic book shop founded in 1909 in San Pedro, California. It was open for 104 years before folding due to the competition of the online book market.

Background 
Williams' was founded by Edward Thorpe "E.T." Williams, an immigrant from Wales who had previously owned a book store in Wales and, subsequently, London. When Williams died in 1940, his eldest daughter, Ethel Williams-Smith, took over the business. She sold the business forty years later to long-time employee Anne Gusha and her son, Jerry; Gusha had first set foot in the store at age 8, in the 1930s, and later became an employee, working part-time initially while in college. Patrons included Charles Bukowski—a regular, according to Gusha—and actor Charles Laughton.

100th anniversary celebration
The store celebrated its 100th anniversary in 2009 with the appearance of various authors including Ray Bradbury, Angi Ma Wong, and Lisa See.

References

1909 establishments in California
American companies established in 1909
Retail companies established in 1909
Bookstores established in the 20th century